Blouse and Skirt was a short-lived BBC Television comedy show (it ran for eight episodes in 2000) that had a Question Time-style format but from a Black British perspective: regulars Curtis Walker and Gina Yashere were joined by guests to take a satirical look at topical subjects, prompted by questions from the audience. Those appearing on Blouse and Skirt included Felix Dexter, Angie Le Mar, Roy Diamond, Jocelyn Jee Esien, Rudi Lickwood, Slim, Helen Da Silva, Charlie Hale, Many Newton, Junior Simpson and Leo Muhammed.

Cast

 Tony Morris - Host 
 Curtis Walker
 Gina Yashere 
 Robbie Gee
 Eddie Nestor

References

2000 British television series debuts
2000 British television series endings
BBC television sketch shows
2000s British comedy television series
Black British television shows
Black British sitcoms